Muhamed was a German horse reportedly able to mentally extract the cube roots of numbers, which he would then tap out with his hooves. Raised in the town of Elberfeld by Karl Krall in the late 19th and early twentieth centuries, he was one of several supposedly gifted horses, the others being Kluge Hans, Zarif, Amassis, and later, Bento, a blind stallion. Muhamed, the most gifted of the animals, could also allegedly perform music and even distinguish between harmony and discord.

While all the horses raised by Krall could demonstrate an apparent ability to read and do basic arithmetic, Muhamed could seemingly perform complicated calculations. When tested by psychologists and scientists, a number was written on a blackboard, and Muhamed was asked to extract the cube root. His left foot represented the tens, while his right foot represented the ones, so that in order to give the answer sixty-five, he would tap six times with his left foot and five times with his right. This method of tapping was also used to demonstrate the horse's spelling, although according to reports, they did not correctly handle German orthography. Krall himself professed disbelief in the notion that Muhamed might be some sort of genius, arguing that human idiot savants are also able to perform mathematical functions rapidly in their heads.

Scientists examining the horses attempted various tests to prove that the horses were being signaled the answers by Krall, and even attempted to blindfold the horses by tying sacks over their heads, and by observing them in the stable through peepholes.

According to Krall, Muhamed, the most intelligent of the horses, eventually began to communicate spontaneously, sometimes even tattling on the other horses for being lazy, or even on the grooms for beating them.

Among the scholars who tested the horses and came away impressed by them were psychologist Edward Claparède, who claimed that they were genuine, and Belgian writer Maurice Maeterlinck, who claimed that Krall had "humanized" the horses.

Muhamed disappeared in World War I, in which he served as a draft animal.

See also
 Clever Hans
 Marocco
 List of historical horses

Footnotes

Trick horses